Robert Francis Prevost, O.S.A. (born September 14, 1955) is a U.S-born prelate of the Catholic Church who was appointed the prefect of the Dicastery for Bishops on January 30, 2023, and is scheduled to assume office on April 12, 2023. He previously served as Bishop of Chiclayo in Peru from 2015 to 2023. A member of the Order of St. Augustine, he worked in Peru from 1985 to 1986 and from 1988 to 1998 as a parish pastor, diocesan official, seminary teacher and administrator. Prevost headed his order from its headquarters in Rome from 2001 to 2013. He spent the years 1987 to 1988 and 1998 to 2001 in the United States, based in Chicago.

Biography

Early life 
Robert Francis Prevost was born in Chicago on September 14, 1955. He completed his secondary studies at the minor seminary of the Order of St. Augustine in 1973.  Prevost earned a Bachelor of Science degree in mathematics at Villanova University in 1977. He joined the Augustinians on September 1, 1977, took his first vows on September 2, 1978, and took his solemn vows on August 29, 1981. The following year he obtained a Master of Divinity degree from Catholic Theological Union in Chicago.

Priesthood 
Prevost was ordained a priest for the Order of St. Augustine in Rome on June 19, 1982. He earned a licentiate and a doctorate degree in canon law from the Pontifical College of St. Thomas Aquinas in Rome in 1984 and 1987, respectively.

Prevost joined the Augustinian mission in Peru in 1985 and served as chancellor of the Territorial Prélature of Chulucanas from 1985 to 1986. He spent the year 1987 to 1988 in the United States as pastor for vocations and director of missions for the Augustinian Province of Chicago. He then returned to Peru, spending the next ten years heading the Augustinian seminary in Trujillo and teaching canon law in the diocesan seminary, where he was also prefect of studies. He served as judge of the regional ecclesiastical court and a member of the College of Consultors of Trujillo. He also led a congregation on the outskirts of the city.

Augustinian leadership
In 1998, Prevost was elected provincial of the Augustinian Province of Chicago and returned to the United States to assume that position on March 8, 1999. 

In 2000 Prevost allowed James Ray, a priest then accused of abusing minors whose ministry had been restricted since 1991, to reside at the Augustinians' St. John Stone Friary in Chicago, despite its close proximity to a Catholic elementary school. The Augustinians did not notify the school administrators about Ray, who was assigned a monitor while in residence and moved to a different residence in 2002 when Church officials adopted stricter rules for priests accused on abusing minors.

In 2001, Prevost was elected to a six-year term as prior general of the Augustinians. He was elected to a second six-year term in 2007. From 2013 to 2014, Prevost was director of formation in the Convent of St. Augustine in Chicago, as well as first councilor and provincial vicar of the Province of Our Mother of Good Counsel, which covers the midwestern United States.

Bishop of Chiclayo 
On November 3, 2014, Pope Francis appointed Prevost as apostolic administrator of the Diocese of Chiclayo and titular bishop of Sufar. He received his episcopal consecration on December 12, 2014. On September 26, 2015, he was named bishop of Chiclayo.

On July 13, 2019, Prevost was appointed a member of the Congregation for the Clergy. On April 15, 2020, he was named apostolic administrator of Callao in Peru. On November 21, 2020, Pope Francis named him a member of the Congregation for Bishops.

Within the Episcopal Conference of Peru, Prevost served on the permanent council for the 2018 to 2020 term. He was elected in 2019 as president of its Commission for Education and Culture. He was also a member of the leadership of Caritas Peru. Prevost had a private audience with Pope Francis on March 1, 2021, fueling speculation of a new assignment either in Chicago or Rome.

Dicastery for Bishops
On January 30, 2023, Pope Francis appointed him prefect of the Dicastery for Bishops, with the title Archbishop-Bishop Emeritus of Chiclayo. Prevost is scheduled to take up his new position on April 12.

Notes

References

External links

  

1955 births
Living people
Augustinian bishops
21st-century Roman Catholic bishops in Peru
Clergy from Chicago
Villanova University alumni
Pontifical University of Saint Thomas Aquinas alumni
American Roman Catholic priests
Bishops appointed by Pope Francis
Roman Catholic bishops of Chiclayo
Officials of the Roman Curia